Pak Chun-nam is a politician of the Democratic People's Republic of Korea (North Korea). He was Minister of Culture in the Cabinet of North Korea from 2014–2019 and a candidate member of the Central Committee of the Workers' Party of Korea.

Biography
After being appointed to the Ministry of Culture in September 2011, he served as the director of the Ministry of Culture, Culture and Tourism since July 2012, and was appointed to the Cultural Prize in September 2013 as the successor to Hong Kwang-sun. In May 2016, the 7th Congress of the Workers 'Party of Korea was elected as a candidate for the Central Committee of the Workers' Party of Korea.

References

Government ministers of North Korea
Workers' Party of Korea politicians
Living people
Year of birth missing (living people)